is Toei's twenty-first production of the Super Sentai metaseries, and the Second Sentai where all heroes are high school students. The footage was also used in the American series, Power Rangers in Space. It aired from February 14, 1997 to February 15, 1998, replacing Gekisou Sentai Carranger and was replaced by Seijuu Sentai Gingaman.

Shout! Factory released  "Denji Sentai Megaranger: The Complete Series" on DVD on October 31, 2017. This is the 6th Super Sentai series to be released in North America on Region 1 DVD. In January 2018, Shout! streamed the series on their website.

Plot

Kenta Date, a senior high school student, is the ultimate champion of an arcade video game called "Megaranger". He belongs to the Cybernetics club, a group of like minded friends from his school. Koichiro Endo, Shun Namiki, Chisato Jogaseki, and Miku Imamura are also members of Cybernetics. The International Network of Excel-Science and Technology (INET), the games creators, invite Kenta and the Cybernetics club members to tour the INET laboratories. Following a short tour of the INET HQ buildings, the company is attacked by the Neijirejia, an evil force led by Dr. Hinelar on a mission to conquer the current reality. Dr. Kubota, INET's chief scientist, reveals that Megaranger was more than only a simple video game but actually a combat simulator to identify potential recruits for a super fighting team to combat the Neijirejia. While the INET headquarters (HQ) is destroyed by the Neijirejia warrior Yugande, Dr. Kubota gives Kenta and his friends devices known as 'Digitizers'. By entering the key-code "3-3-5" and shouting "Install, Megaranger!", Date, Endo, Namiki, Jogasaki and Imamura transform into the Megarangers to fight the Nejirejia.

INET

Megarangers

Five high school students chosen by INET become the Megarangers, with one additional Megaranger who is an INET agent. Their base of operations is the Digital Research Club at Moroboshi High School.

Kenta Date 
: 18 years old, Kenta is a slacker and knucklehead who likes yakiniku (to a point where he will ask Dr. Kubota to treat him to a yakiniku lunch for every mission accomplished), but is also friendly, playful, and has a good heart. He becomes an ideal candidate to become a Megaranger after beating a skilled opponent on INET's Megaranger arcade game, which was actually a tool used to recruit Megarangers.

Mega Red's forehead symbol is a Personal computer; ironically, Kenta is the only member who does not like computers. This symbol allows him to upload data and program skills into his mind, making him an adaptable warrior.

Kouichirou Endo 
: 18 years old, Kouichirou is the functioning leader and overachiever of the team. Aside from being a keen soccer player, he is a member of the class committee and is concerned about his schoolwork. He balances his duties as a Megaranger and a student. He has a younger brother, Koujiro, who also plays soccer. A natural leader but extremely bossy, he once created an hour by hour schedule for all the Megarangers to follow but they ignored it. During his stay at the Epinard Nasu hotel in Tochigi, Kouichirou encounters a mysterious boy who is a spiritual representation of the forest that is not only in danger of Kinoko Nejire's attack on it but INET's Relay Base. He eventually gains the forest spirit's trust as he uses up all his power to help the Megarangers as Kouichirou promises to have INET relocate the relay base.

Mega Black's forehead symbol is the digital satellite, which enables him to trace communication sources and transmissions.
 Special attacks: Satellite Search, Satellite Scan,  (soccer ball kicking attack).

Shun Namiki 
: 18 years old, Shun is a loner who aspires to become a computer-graphics artist and initially refuses to become a Megaranger. After seeing Kenta attempt to keep the Kune Kune from interfering in his lifelong dreams, Shun reconsiders and becomes good friends with Kenta. He plays the flute, as his late mother was a world-renowned flautist. Shun is adept at creating battle strategies, such as confusing the Nejirangers by making the other Megaranger suits look like his. Shun is a Virgo, according to Miku.

Mega Blue's forehead symbol is a Digital television, which allows him to create CG images and trap enemies in a movie dimension where characters from that dimension attack the enemy.

 Special attacks: Virtual Vision, Virtual Holograph.

Chisato Jougasaki 
: 18 years old, Chisato dreams of becoming a professional photographer. Aside from photography, she is also into singing. She is attracted to Kouichirou. Compared to the rest of her teammates, she gets the least amount of focus (sans from the episode previews).

Mega Yellow's forehead symbol is a Digital camera, which can telescopically search for people and things – even allowing her to see through walls. This symbol also allows her to record and playback anything she sees.
 Special attacks: Digicam Search, Galaxy Search, .

Miku Imamura 
: 18 years old, Miku eats a lot, but is very self-conscious about her weight. She dislikes schoolwork just as much as Kenta, and because of this, the two of them are very good friends. She is attracted to Shun. During the Megarangers' encounter with Bibidebi on episode 17, Miku is accidentally hit by an evolution beam and becomes , which makes the colored squares on her costume turn gold. As Super Mega Pink, Miku gains super strength and can wield the other Megarangers' weapons. Additionally, her intelligence increases to an IQ of 800, along with a change in her personality. However, after suffering painful side effects, Miku manages to return to her normal self. In Gaoranger vs. Super Sentai, she lectures Sae Taiga (Gao White) on the Super Sentai franchise's many female warriors and their shared skill at changing their clothes in the blink of an eye, something that Sae had never done before.

Mega Pink's forehead symbol is a Cellular phone, which can track and analyze sound waves.
 Special attacks: Telephone Search.

Yuusaku Hayakawa 
: The 25-year-old chief of INET's Special Development Division, Yuusaku is one of the scientists under Kubota who created the Mega Suits, including Mega Silver which was the prototype Mega Suit. Though he is placed in charge of the Super Mega Project, Yuusaku secretly took the Mega Silver powers for his own use in helping the Megarangers despite Kubota's insistence that he gets back to work. Initially, Yuusaku's transformation into Mega Silver lasts for 2.5 minutes due to how powerful it was, but he was able to repair it by the time Nejirejia discovers this. Yuusaku also pilots his own mecha, Mega Winger. He has also demonstrated his culinary skills by preparing a lavish meal to distract a Nezire Beast before Mega Pink defeats it. In the final battle, he is able to assist the Megarangers by using his damaged Mega Winger to free the Voyager Machines from the rubble of the INET Moonbase to give the Megarangers a chance of defeating Death Nejiro and attend their high school graduation ceremony.

Mega Silver's forehead symbol is the microchip.

Allies

INET members

Prof. Eikichi Kubota 
: He is in charge of the Megaranger program – specifically the  Megarangers video game. During a surprise attack on the NASADA base by the Nezirejia, he is forced to give the Digitizers to five students – turning them into Megarangers. He was once friends with Dr. Samejima, who had left this dimension for Nezirejia – becoming Dr. Hinelar. Dr. Kubota is a former high school boxer and he plays the trumpet.

Eikichi Kubota is portrayed by Satoru Saitō.

Shougo Kawasaki 
Shougo Kawasaki (川崎 省吾 Kawasaki Shōgo): A young man who is the head engineer of the Mega Ship's maintenance department. His father, Professor Kawasaki, is a world authority on robot control programs (helped create the program for Delta Mega) and wants Shougo to attend college, using the program he developed for Delta Mega to get his son back on Earth. However, after Mega Red saves Shougo from Guirail, he is allowed to remain with INET.

Shougo Kawasaki is portrayed by Yuki Tanaka.

Tachibana 
Tachibana (立花 Tachibana): A member of INET and a crew member aboard the Galaxy Mega.

Tachibana is portrayed by Takao Miyashita (宮下 敬夫 Miyashita Takao).

Pop 
Pop (ポップ Poppu) is a technician associated with I.N.E.T. who assists the Megarangers.

Pop is portrayed by Samuel Pop Aning.

Moroboshi High School 
: The high school attended by the five Megarangers until the series finale. Each of the team's classmates and teachers ended up being involved in a Nejirejian scheme and they become enraged when they learned the identities of the Megarangers to which almost everyone turns against them. It was only in the final battle with Dr. Hinelar that the school realized the error of their stand and started to support the Megarangers.

Gen Ooiwa 
Gen Ooiwa (大岩 厳 Ōiwa Gen): The class' lazy Homeroom/Science teacher. Despite his laziness, he manages to find ways to motivate his students – especially the well-disciplined Kouichirou. In episode 12, while the Megarangers battle Mole Nezire Mr. Ooiwa stumbles upon a meteorite fragment and keeps it in his possession, making him a target of the Nejirejia. When he and Mega Black are captured by Mole Nezire, he tells the overachiever to never give up. As a result, Mr. Ooiwa inspires Mega Black to break free and foil the Nezirejian plans. During the finale, despite the Megarangers being expelled, he is the only staff member not to turn his back on the Megaranger and together with Jirou and Erina start the pep rally to cheer the Megarangers on.

Gen Ooiwa is portrayed by Yoshihiro Nozoe.

Shintarou Wada 
Shintarou Wada (和田 シンタロウ Wada Shintarō, 6, 45 & 49–51): An overweight shy boy who has a crush on Miku. He threatened to reveal some secret photos of Miku to the school unless she would go on a date with him.  Miku agrees as she thought the photos were of her transforming into Mega Pink. The photos are of her sleeping in class and the nurse's office. Shintarou was placed under the control of the Thorn Nejilar to do Dr. Hinelar's bidding until he is freed by the Megarangers. Later after the Megaranger's secret identities are exposed and Jirou is injured during the Nejilars attack, Shintarou blames the Megarangers and turns his back on them. He comes around during the final battle and cheers his friends on. Afterwards, he graduates with his classmates.

Shintarou Wada is portrayed by Takenari Hirowara.

Jirou Iwamoto 
Jirou Iwamoto (岩本 ジロウ Iwamoto Jirō, 6, 45, 49 & 51): Shintarou's best friend and spokesperson due to Shintarou's shy personality. He consoles Shintarou when Miku turns him down for a second date. Near the finale, he is injured when the Megarangers' secret identities are exposed. During the final battle, a bandaged Jirou returns to the school and together with Erina and Mr. Ōiwa started the pep rally to cheer the Megarangers on. Afterwards, he graduates with his classmates.

Jirou Iwamoto is portrayed by Takumi Hashimoto.

Erina 
Erina (恵理奈 Erina, 37 & 49–51): A classmate of the Megarangers. After the Megaranger's secret identities are exposed, she is among the few people in the school who still supports the Megarangers and tried unsuccessfully to convince the school staff not to expel them. It is heavily implied she is attracted to Kenta. Ultimately with Jirou and Mr. Ooiwa she started the pep rally to cheer the Megarangers on, which would be instrumental in restoring the Megaranger's fighting spirit, contributing to their final victory against Dr. Hinelar and the Death Neziros. Afterwards, she graduates with her classmates.

Erina is portrayed by Emi Shigemitsu.

Other

Takeshi 
Takeshi (タケシ Takeshi): One of the arcade children Kenta befriended. He was used by Guirail in a scheme to break Mega Red's fighting spirit by having the boy receive the end of Mega Red's punch.

Takeshi is portrayed by Yōsuke Asari.

Picot 
Space Fairy Picot (宇宙妖精ピコット Uchū Yosei Pikotto): Known as the "Light of Hope", Picot is a dragon-like fairy who assumes a clam-like form while traveling to a planet where he can only grant five wishes. After fulfilling the wishes, Picot leaves the planet and would eventually return to the visited planet 100,004,000 years later. Though originally chased by Helmedor, Picot becomes targeted by the Nejireians as well. While on Earth, Picot granted Miku's giant cake wish, Kyosuke's wish for katsudon, Helmedor's planet destroying laser cannon, and Kani Nejilar's wish to bring dead Psycho Nejilars back to life. After granting Kenta's wish for the Megarangers to have for energy to keep fighting, giving them their Mega Tector armor and aiding the Carrangers, Picot leaves for the next planet.

Space Fairy Picot is voiced by Fushigi Yamada (山田 ふしぎ Yamada Fushigi).

Arsenal
 : The main Megarangers' special tool. By dialing certain number codes into the Digitizer (worn on the wrist), they can activate their , call their Cyber Sliders, and launch their mecha.
 335: Ranger transformation. (Transformation call is )
 259: Calls the Cyber Sliders.
 761: Calls the Digitank.
 108: Launches the Mega Shuttle.
 541: Starts the Galaxy Mega formation.
The Drill Saber is broken by Yugande but soon repaired with a new capability, becoming the  – formed when the Drill Sniper is combined with a small screw. Most of the time, this weapon is used alongside the Multi Attack Rifle. It can also be powered into the Super Drill Sniper Custom by pressing "03" on the Battle Riser to transfer its energy into the Drill Saber.
 : Mega Black's Mega Weapon with which he can perform the  attack.
 : Mega Blue's Mega Weapon with which he can perform the  attack.
 : Mega Yellow's Mega Weapon.
 : Mega Pink's Mega Weapon.
 : Surfboard-like vehicles the Megarangers use to move through space.
 : Mega Red's Cyber Slider.
 : Mega Black's Cyber Slider.
 : Mega Blue's Cyber Slider.
 : Mega Yellow's Cyber Slider.
 : Mega Pink's Cyber Slider.
 : A highly durable armored vehicle used by the Megarangers for transportation, as well as Prof. Kubota whenever he enters the battlefield on occasion. Created as the ultimate rescue tool. Can be used to enter dangerous areas or to burrow underground and has a scanner called the MultiView Searcher to scan through walls and a fire extinguishing spray. The Digitank was destroyed when Prof. Kubota tried to fight off Shibolena and Yugande near the finale.
 : Combination of the Mega Rod, Mega Tomahawk, Mega Sling, and Mega Capture wielded by Mega Black. Most of the time, this weapon is used alongside the Drill Sniper Custom.
 : A special wrist-worn device given to Kenta by Prof. Kubota. It allows for powered-up chop, punch, and shooting attacks. It is also used to summon and control the Delta Mega, and to activate the Super Galaxy Mega formation. In the two final battles against the Nejirangers, Mega Silver receives his own Battle Riser to control the Delta Mega and to help fight with Mega Winger. Near the finale, Mega Black and Mega Yellow receive their own Battle Risers. In Episode 29 and Gaoranger vs. Super Sentai, Mega Pink has a Battle Riser. It is uncertain if Mega Blue received his own Battle Riser device, though Prof. Kubota once used the Battle Riser to command the Delta Mega in Episode 50 during the defense of the INET Moonbase.
 02: Fires Vulcan beams, even when a Megaranger does not have their Digital Suit on.
 03: Enhances the Mega Sniper's firepower by 15 times (mostly on the Super Drill Sniper Custom for the  finisher). This ability was originally non-functional until it was uploaded in Episode 33.
 : Mega Silver's transformation device. It uses many of the same features as the Digitizer (but with Mega Silver's own unique vehicle) and is also used as an actual cellphone. The device's name is actually a play-off of "Keitai Denwa", or "cellular phone".
 2580 – MEGA: Ranger transformation. (Transformation call is )
 259: Calls the Auto Slider.
His finisher is the  – a barrage of blasts in Gun Mode, followed by a close blade slash in Sword Mode. A variation of the Blazer Impact can be performed with just the sword slash alone.
 : An upgrade armor that the Megarangers receive in Megaranger vs. Carranger. Their finisher, involves them turning into balls of light and destroying their enemies not unlike the Lights of Ginga. The armor was a movie exclusive and was never used in the actual TV series.

INET Mecha
The mecha used by the Megaranger were made by INET.

Galaxy Mega 
: Combination of Mega Ship and Mega Shuttle. Initially, INET thought the Megarangers did not fully use the robot's potential and had their tactics programmer, Professor Toyokawa, install a program that allows Galaxy Mega to fight without a human pilot. But the Shrimp Nezire incident helped Toyokama to understand the negative potential and he allows the robot to remain in Kubota's control. The Galaxy Mega's last appearance in the series was when it was rendered inoperable by Burning Yugande, but was repaired and used again in Gingaman vs. Megaranger. Galaxy Mega's power helped to power up GaoKing in Gaoranger vs. Super Sentai. The Booster Rifle can fire energy blasts or freezing gas to freeze opponents.

 : Orbital space station for Megarangers and Prof. Kubota. The sides and nose form Galaxy Mega's legs, and the undercarriage forms the arms while the underbelly becomes the shield. Armed with the Mega Particle Cannon. There are a hundred people who work inside Mega Ship. Following the near destruction of the Galaxy Mega by Mad Guirail and the debut of the Mega Voyager, Prof. Kubota sets up command at the INET Moonbase instead, and the Mega Ship was usually stored there in the docking bay unless if it was needed.
 : The orbiter forms Galaxy Mega's head (the engine becomes the "mullet", and the cockpit becomes the cranium). The Shuttle Booster forms the Booster Rifle (with the fuel tank holding the handle and muzzle). The orbiter docks in the nose. The Shuttle Booster can be docked to the underside of the Mega Ship. On the toy, the Shuttle Booster can also add weapons to the Mega Ship by separating into three pieces with the fuel tank becoming a cannon on the underbelly and the rocket boosters on the sides. This function is never seen in the series.

Delta Mega 
: An additional mecha created by Prof. Kubota that is activated and controlled by either Mega Red or Mega Silver using the Battle Riser. Its program was developed by Prof. Kawasaki. One panel in the central control room was for the program to start it with another to start a self-destruct program. It made its debut in Episode 20. Comes by the command "DeltaMega Install!". However, there is a flaw in the control system which Guirail takes advantage of and uses against the Megarangers. But after Galaxy Mega sent out a wave circuit to Delta Mega its Fusion System activated, later combining into Super Galaxy Mega. When the Battle Riser is placed into the Galaxy Mega's controls it allows for the Delta Mega to combine with it to form the Super Galaxy Mega. Much like the Mega Ship, the Delta Mega was also moved and stored in the INET Moonbase's docking bay unless if it was needed following the debut of the Mega Voyager. The Delta Mega was destroyed near the finale by a powered-up Yugande, but rebuilt and reappeared in Gaoranger vs. Super Sentai.

Super Galaxy Mega 
: Combination of Galaxy Mega and Delta Mega. First appeared in Episode 21. In this mode the Delta Mega's Gatling Blasters are positioned on the shoulders of the Super Galaxy Mega and three times stronger than normal. The Super Galaxy Mega's finisher is called the  where it fires both fist like rockets to destroy the enemy. The Super Galaxy Mega spins around at high speeds, flies up into the air, and finally shots down like a comet and blasts through the Mad Guirail. Mad Guirail survived the attack.

Mega Voyager 
: A series of mecha created by INET's Special Development Division in the Super Mega Project which Yuusaku oversees. When Mad Guirail overpowered the Super Galaxy Mega, the Megarangers obtain use of the Voyager Machines, which are launched from the INET Moonbase. The five Voyager Machines were combined into . Mega Voyager used the top section of Rocket Voyager 3 as its main weapon for the  finisher. Aside from using Rocket Voyager 3 as a weapon, Mega Voyager has also used Galaxy Mega's Mega Saber. It continued to be the Megarangers' primary mecha until it was destroyed in the final battle with Hinelar and Death Nejiros in the series finale.

 : Piloted by Mega Red, Rovoyager 1 is a humanoid robot (based on an astronaut's spacesuit) with two large missile batteries on its shoulders. Forms the waist and upper legs of Mega Voyager.
 : Piloted by Mega Black, Shuttle Voyager 2 is a space shuttle that can fire an energy blast from its nose. Forms Mega Voyager's head and shield.
 : Piloted by Mega Blue, Rocket Voyager 3 is a large rocket ship that becomes the Voyager Spartan weapon for Mega Voyager, and also becomes Mega Voyager's lower legs and abdominal area. Kenta often used it as a surfboard for Rovoyager 1.
 : Piloted by Mega Yellow, Saucer Voyager 4 is a UFO-like spaceship that can fire energy blasts from its wings. Forms Mega Voyager's body and arms, and the blasters on both sides of its thrusters attach to Mega Voyager's head. The jet engines also serve as the firing apparatus for the Mega Voyager's Voyager Pulsar.
 : Piloted by Mega Pink, Tank Voyager 5 is a covered tank with two large cannons on top. Forms Mega Voyager's feet.

Mega Winger 
: Personal mecha of Mega Silver, created by Yuusaku, allows him to operate as Mega Silver, as part of the Mega Space Project. It could donate its  to Mega Voyager, transforming it into Wing Mega Voyager. The undercarriage forms the lower legs and the "nose" becomes the arms (the inside parts spinning to become the forearms), revealing the head. The Mega Winger's final battle was in Episode 50, where it was crippled in battle against Burning Yugande while defending the INET Moonbase. But Yuusaku was able to use the damaged Mega Winger to free the Voyager Machines from the rubble of the INET Moonbase before it finally collapsed due to the earlier damage.

Evil Electric Kingdom Nezirejia
The  are invaders from another dimension ruled by an entity called Javious. Their names and appearances are all twisted and distorted. They have stationed in the  fortress which transforms into the giant robot  in the series finale. This robot can regenerate severed limbs as well as bind and electrocute his victims with cables and was finally destroyed along with the Mega Voyager in the finale. Hinelar self-destructed the Death Neziros from the inside in an attempt to blow up the Megarangers, the people in their high school and the Mega Voyager. The Megarangers nearly sacrifice themselves to carry Death Neziros with the Mega Voyager into the sky to prevent any further damage to their high school.

 is the ruler of Nezirejia. He appears only as a giant eye on the screen of the Death Neziros. Very little is known about him and he is killed when the last of the Nejirangers, whose life forces are connected to his, are destroyed by the Megarangers. Upon his death, Javious was revealed to be the nucleus of Nejirejia which fades away upon his death. Only Javious' heart remained, which Hinelar used to power his Hinelar City, which was later destroyed along with Hinelar City. Javious the First is voiced by Ryūzaburō Ōtomo.
 is the leader of the Nezirejia invasion party. He was originally a cybernetics scientist named , who studied space exploring suits and lost his beloved daughter in one of his experiments, destroying his reputation and scarring him. He later worked with Kubota on an interdimensional project, being the first to discover the existence of Nezirejia. A year later, Samejima decides to enter the dimension to prove its existence in spite of Kubota's pleas not to be reckless and ends up becoming Javious', right-hand man. Kubota later realized that Dr. Hinelar and Samejima are one and the same when he recognizes that the suits of the Nejirangers are similar to the Power Suits Samejima had developed. Hinelar later plots and successfully kills Javious through the Nejirangers, to become the new high leader of the Nejirejians. After the destruction of Javious, the Nezire Dimension closes making Hinelar build  in which he intended to concentrate all mankind as data cards. Soon after the destruction of his city, Hinelar began his personal attack on the Megarangers after learning their identities and making sure that they become outcasts to society. But Yugande's and Shibolena's demises drove Hinelar over the edge gained a monster form to battle the Megarangers himself. However, the device that kept his body from warping on itself (a side effect from being in Nezirejia) was damaged and he retreated into the Death Neziros and turning it into Grand Neziros. When GrandNeziros exploded during the Mega Voyager's sacrifice, Hinelar dies, still inside while trying to will his body from collapsing onto itself. Dr. Hinelar is portrayed by Tetsuo Morishita.
 is a cybernetic gynoid modeled after Hinelar's long dead daughter, Shizuka. Considers herself the masterpiece of Dr. Hinelar's work. She was second-in-command to Hinelar on the Death Neziros, a mistress of disguise and illusions. Armed with a rapier, she was also the smart one, often initiating plans for conquest. Creating Rose Nezire through her own DNA, Shibolena poses as a nun to give her offshoot's roses to children, turning them into slaves and subject them to Demon Therapy to create "Little Rose Nezire". But with one of the children being her new friend Ruri, Chisato arrives and nearly exposes herself as Mega Yellow (whom Shibolena establishes a rivalry with) to wound Shibolena with her Blade Arm. Fortunately, Mega Blue creates a holographic duplicate of Chisato to confuse Shibolena. She was critically wounded near the finale, by Mega Red, while protecting Yugande. She makes it back to the Death Neziros, to inform Hinelar of Yugande's death. Her body explodes right before Dr. Hinelar's eyes after she says goodbye to her master. The design of her hairstyle-like helmet is based on a CG illustration used as a reference. Shibolena is portrayed by Asami Jo.
 is a little annoying imp monster that begins his sentences with "Bibi" and ends them with "debi". In episode 3, Dr. Hinelar modified him with the ability to make the Nezire Beasts grow by biting them and injecting them with a  whenever they are destroyed or are nearing defeat at the hands of the Megarangers. In secret, Bibidebi wanted to be the head of Nejirejia and has some affection for Shibolena, secretly sending Canary Nezire to act on his behalf. He appears to have died in the Grand Neziros when it was destroyed, by Mega Voyager's suicide attempt. Later, it is revealed that he teleported Hizumina out of the giant robot before the destruction.
 is a prideful wire-frame model-themed robot general created by Hinelar whom he admires and unconditionally obeys. He wields the  sword. Being high-strung, Yugande offers to handle the Megarangers himself. Using a divide and conquer strategy to take out the Megaranger members one by one, Yugande gets Mega Red to fight him in subspace so no one would interfere and nearly kills him before the others manage to breach the barrier. Mega Black is badly injured as they get their teammate to safety. Later, Yugande calls Mega Red out, attacking him in his enlarged form as the others arrive to aid him. Using Galaxy Mega, the Megarangers weaken him with the Saber Electromagnetic Whip before killing him with the Mega Side Cutter. However, Yugande is later rebuilt through the Nejzre Circle in a stronger form, . But as he needs to get used to his upgrade, Yugande remained on the sidelines until the "Ultimate Lifeform" incident, attempting to exact revenge on Mega Red while the monster feeds. Though he manages to destroy Mega Red's Drill Saber and nearly kills him, Yugande is driven off by the Megarangers' Multi Attack Rifle. Later, he was critically wounded in Episode 30 when Guirail uses him as a shield to protect him from the Super Galaxy Mega's Super Galaxy Knuckle. Yugande uses a special chip to take on a more powerful, red-colored form called . With this new power, Yugande proves to be a difficult challenge for the Megarangers, as he destroys the Delta Mega, badly damages the Galaxy Mega and Mega Winger and nearly destroys the Voyager Machines when he damages the INET Moonbase. Yugande, however, meets his end when the Nezi Reactor inside him is damaged and he is killed by Mega Red. Yugande is voiced by Hirotaka Suzuoki.
 is a bandaged warrior was one of Javious' trusted minions, he is sent to Earth to aid Hinelar with the Megarangers. Guirail used crueler methods than Dr. Hinelar's (an example of this is in his first appearance where he used children as shields), even performing unusual experiments on the Nezire Beasts. Prior to revealing himself to Hinelar's group, Guirail stages an attack to capture the children of a city district while breaking Kenta's will to fight by having him hit Takeshi by accident. However, while leading a new attack on a communication building, Guirail messes with Mega Red until he is beaten by him with the Battle Rizer. Later on, he infected Yugande to become . But when the Super Galaxy Mega used its Super Galaxy Knuckle attack, Guirail canceled out the fusion to use Yugande as a shield to protect himself. An angry Shibolena tries to kill him but Dr. Hinelar stopped and tricked Guirail into taking the Nezire Source Capsule that gives him tremendous power and robs him of his sanity.  This mutated Guirail into an insane beast called  who was so powerful that the Super Galaxy Mega was no match for it. Using full power, the Super Galaxy Mega only caused him to break off a piece of his body that formed into , who could fly through space and blast a powerful laser from his forehead. The Megarangers were able to escape to the INET Moonbase on the Delta Mega where Yuusaku gave them the Voyager Machines. In the end, Gigire, and later Mad Guirail, were the first two to be killed by the Mega Voyager. Guirail is voiced by Tatsuyuki Jinnai.
  is the last of Hinelar's creations and Shibolena's "Younger Sister", mostly identical save for her armor being purplish. She secretly wished to revive Hinelar having grown to miss him with Shibolena's memories, but was betrayed by Gregory when participating in reviving the Balban space pirates. Surviving the treachery, Hizumina attempts to take advantage of the fight to kill the Megarangers, only to be ultimately killed by Mega Red.
  are Nezirejia's grunts, having twisted faces and using twisted blades as their weapons. They are also able to assume human form.
 : A black-headed version of the Kunekune able to fire energy from his hands. Posing as a police officer, Boss Kunekune leads his Nezire Army into taking over the Yuhigaoka Apartment Building in the H Ward as part of a plan to secretly replace every person on Earth with Kunkune. When Megarangers uncover the plan, the Kunekune attempt to kill off Mega Red and Mega Pink with their massive numbers before Boss Kunekune arrives to finish them off. However, after being defeated by Mega Red's Drill Sniper Custom, Boss Kunekune calls his army to group around him to form , with his head in the heart area. Because he was composed of many Kunekune, King Kunekune could close wounds in seconds. When Boss Kunekune was destroyed by the Galaxy Mega with the Booster Rifle, King Kunekune disassembled in the explosion.

Nezirangers
The  group were created by Dr. Hinelar from Javious I's DNA as evil counterparts to the Megarangers. Their suits are similar to power suits Dr. Hinelar had developed back when he was known as Samejima. They share an attack called Neji Energy Attack. Unfortunately, the Nezirangers were impatient and wanted nothing more than to kill their Megaranger counterparts. The Nezirangers were used by Hinelar not only to kill the Megarangers in suicide attacks, but also to kill Javious by slowly draining him of his "life energy". When badly damaged or enlarged, they transformed into their monstrous true forms. The Nezirangers' urge to kill managed to keep them from dying as they used Hinelar's data-card machine to regain physical form. They not only resume their original goal but also to try to kill Hinelar for using them in the first place. The Megarangers manage to digitize them, preserving them as Data Cards in the now destroyed Hinelar City. Hinelar found the cards soon after the city was destroyed and sent them to where no one would ever find them.

Once turned on Dr. Hinelar when he discovered that the Nezirangers were mere pawns in Hinelar's plans, but had his free will removed. Killed by Super Galaxy Mega, Mega Voyager and Mega Winger, later turned into a Data Card.
Killed by Super Galaxy Mega, Mega Voyager and Mega Winger, later turned into a Data Card.
As the most sadistic of the five, he became obsessed with specifically fighting and killing Mega Blue. Killed by Wing Mega Voyager, later turned into a Data Card.
She is the most cunning member and rival of Nezi Pink. Killed by Super Galaxy Mega, Mega Voyager and Mega Winger, later turned into a Data Card.
After making a bet with Nezi Yellow to see which one of them would take away the mask of their respective Megaranger counterparts and bringing them back, Nezi Pink faced off against both Mega Yellow and Mega Pink who defeated her with a Capture Sniper and Blade Arm combo. With Mega Silver using Mega Winger as a shield while the Megarangers channeled all of Mega Voyager's power into their Voyager Spartan, they managed to use the super-powered Voyager Spartan to finally destroy Nezi Jealous. Later turned into a Data Card.

Nezire Beasts
Assume physical form". Once the process is complete, a Nezire Beast is born and fully matured. There is always some part on the body of the Nezire Beast that is twisted.

 : The first Nezire Beast to be sent down to earth, attacking the Musashi district. The Ei Nezire could fly through space as well as fire laser blasts from his eyes. Kenta held the monster at bay until the rest of team arrives. Wounded by Mega Red with the Drill Saber, Ei Nezire retreated into the Nezi Crusher, killed off when Galaxy Mega destroyed the giant machine.
 : This Nezire could create earthquakes when he walked as well as drill through large buildings with the drill on his face. Rhino Nezire could also deflect blasts from the drill when it was spinning fast. Rhino Nezire was sent to flush out the Megarangers, attacking the CG Center where Shun was located. Though Kenta attempted to keep him way from Shun Namiki while he was saving his program, Rhino Nezire destroyed the disc when Shun decided to save Kenta and fight alongside the team. Though defeated by MegaRed's Screw Drill Saber/Saber Slash combo, Dr. Hinelar arrives with the modified Bibidebi to infect the Nezire Beast with the Enlarging Virus integrated in Bibidebi's DNA. In the end, the Galaxy Mega destroyed it with Mega Flying Cutter. 
 : This Nezire was used by Shibolena to project her image across the internet with the digital camera on his shoulder, which in the process would take control of people and have them undergo "Nezirian Teaching" to make them into blood-thirsty sadists. After freeing Miss Nishiyama from the mind control with Kouichirou unconscious, Shun managed to pinpoint the address, only to fall into a trap as they were sucked into a pocket dimension where Chameleon Nezire is omnipotent as he electrocuted the four. Koichiro managed to find the real location and battled Chameleon Nezire, overwhelmed by the monster's camouflage until Mega Black use Satellite Searcher to negate the effect and managed to free the others. The others arrived in time and used their Final Shoot attack to defeat the Chameleon Nezire. Bibidebi arrived soon afterwards and infected Chameleon Nezire into a giant, only to be killed by Galaxy Mega's Saber Electromagnetic Whip and Mega Dash Cutter. However, only the Nezire's arm remained with a shard from the Mega Saber in it.
 : This Nezire, able to launch his pinchers like boomerags, had his DNA modified with the shard of the MegaSaber found from Chameleon Nezire's remains, making his shell impervious to the Galaxy Mega's sword. He attacked the volcanic mountainside to lure out the Megarangers and allowed himself to be infected by Bibidebi. The programmed Galaxy Mega arrives, only to be overpowered as Shrimp Nezire attempted to send it into the volcano. Once the Megarangers regained control, the GalaxyMega turned the tables and ripped the Nezire's whiskers off. Using the Saber Electromagnetic Whip, the Galaxy Mega grabbed Shrimp Nezire and threw him into the volcano to destroy him. 
 : This Nezire possessed superhuman strength, ideal for his mission to knock over an energy system tower in an act of terrorism, resulting with the building's generator undergoing a meltdown that would destroy the city. With Miku in the tower, Mega Black and Mega Blue had to deal with Elephant Nezire while Mega Red and Chisato used the Digi Tank to get her and Shintaro out of the building before taking the cooling the energy rods to stop the meltdown. By then, Elephant Nezire was enlarged by Bibidebi and tore the tower down as the Digi Tank escaped. With Mega Pink, the Megarangers formed the Galaxy Mega and defeated the Nezire with swift punches before killing him with Galaxy Mega's Mega Flying Cutter attack.
 : A stealth Nezire Beast Shibolena sends into space to cause lightning to strike down on every major city in the world. This Nezire Beast could also shoot beams from his eyes and launch a barrage of Space Bees from his "hive blade" on his hand. As Mega Red and the others investigate the Van Allen belt, Kouchirou and Chisato uncover Shibolena's plan to use the mind-controlled staff at the Space Observation Center and other space centers to create an Attack Dispersion Net which Hachi Nezire would use to take out every city at one time. He is then blasted back to Earth with the Final Shoot and defeated with the Digital Combination. After being bitten by Bibidebi, Hachi Nezire battles Galaxy Mega and is destroyed by the Booster Rifle.
 : A Nezire Beast that could manipulate sound and signals. Koumori Nezire uses his bats to burns a special soundwave into CDs that cause those who hear it to commit acts of violence without any memory of it as part of Shibolena's plan to perfect brainwashing of humanity. When Saeko learned of it and attempts to gather the CDs, Shibolena sends Koumori Nezire after her to force her to commit suicide. But Chisato manages to free Saeko from Koumori Nezire's hold before she joins the fight against him, overpowering him by using the Mega Sling to defeat him. After being bitten by Bibidebi, Koumori Nezire attempts to overpower Galaxy Mega with his soundwaves until Saeko's intervention allows Galaxy Mega to destroy Koumori Nezire with the Mega Cross Cutter.
 : Koumori Nezire's remains were gathered and he was recreated. With a series of female androids at his disposal, Neo Koumori Nezire provides them with flutes and send them across the world to play the Murderous Soundwave, an enhanced version of the Rage Soundwave. However, one of his robots, Number 167 who looks exactly like Shun's deceased mother, develops a mind of her own as a result of being hit by a truck. Attempting too destroy her, he is forced to fallback after Mega Blue overpowers her. Tracking his creation down, Neo Koumori Nezire uses his Murderous Soundwaves on the Megarangers until 167 comes to their aid and uses Shun's flute to negate the Nezire Beast's attack before she self-destructs to protect him. Enraged, Mega Blue attacks Neo Koumori Nezire in full fury before defeating him with the Tomahawk Sniper. Once enlarged by Bibidebi, Neo Koumori Nezire is easily destroyed by Galaxy Mega's Mega Dash Cutter.
 : This Nezire was partially created from Shibolena's DNA, linking them via the rose on Shibolena's rapier. As a result, Bara Nezire could recover from any wound as long as Shibolena was all right. While Chisato goes off after Shibolena, the other Megarangers have a hard time fighting Bara Nezire who whips the Megarangers with her vines and blast them with her shoulder flowers. Deciding to finish the fight, Bara Nezire allows Bibidebi to bite her and she overpowers Galaxy Mega. However, when Mega Yellow destroys Shibolena's rose, Bara Nezire loses her advantage and is destroyed by Galaxy Mega's Galaxy Lance.
 : This subterranean-combat Nezire builds a machine to attract a piece of a heat-guiding meteor to Tokyo to use its energy to destroy the city in one blow. Managing to overpower Mega Black, but losing a fragment of the meteor, Mogura Nezire falls back and later abducts Mr. Ooiwa and Mega Black. With Mega Black regaining his composure, he saves Ooiwa and fights Mogura Nezire as the others arrive and destroy Mogura Nezire's base. Mega Black then breaks Mogura Nezire's claws off and was about to kill him when Bibidebi intervenes and bites the Nezire Beast. With Mega Black piloting Galaxy Mega, Mogura Nezire is destroyed by the giant robot's Galaxy Lance.
 : This Nezire could hypnotize people and blind/blast them with harsh rays from his large eyes. Fukurou Nezire infiltrates Gojounin Academy's Digital Research to brainwash the genius students through their monitors and have them build digital blueprints for a weapon of mass destruction, which he builds within the school's basement. Investigating the school as a favor to his friend Souichi, who is possessed by the Nezire Beast, Shun uncovers Fukurou Nezire's plan and fakes being hypnotized to sabotage the weapon. Enraged at being tricked, Fukurou Nezire battles the Megarangers until they defeat him with the Digital Formation. After being bitten by Bibidebi and bursting out the school, Fukurou Nezire battles Galaxy Mega. Improvising a counterattack, Mega Blue places a mirror coating on Galaxy Mega's Mega Shield to deflect the attack back at Nezire Beast's eyes before the robot uses the Mega Dash Cutter attack to finish him off.
 : A Nezire Beast that is fed Hinelar's Nezire Poison, a deadly toxin he is immune to, which takes effect after 24 hours. He is to spread it around to kill as many as he can. Dokuga Nezire flies around the city, distributing the Nezire Poison on his wings, with the Megarangers affected along with 10,000 people and have until 6 pm to find an antidote. After a brief falling out, the Megarangers regroup and manage to break off a piece of antenna as the poison takes effect on them with Mega Black managing to deliver the item to INET to prepares an antidote from the Nezire Beast's immunity. By the time the Megarangers almost lose to Dokuga Nezire without their Mega Suits, they receive the antidote. Using the Drill Sniper Custom and Multi Attack Rifle, they defeat Dokuga Nezire as Bibidebi arrives to bite him. After ripping off his wing and learning that his death would cover the entire city, Galaxy Mega takes Dokuga Nezire into space and uses the Booster Rifle to destroy him.
 : A Nezire Beast that appears in Tochigi's Rindou Lake while the Megarangers were on a field trip as one of hundreds of eggs which Bibidebi was sent to mature with a red-liquid acceleration gun and deal with the Megarangers through a blue-liquid retrograde gun. However, after Bibidebi drops the acceleration gun into the lake during the fight after blasting Miku with it my mistake, it causes one of the eggs to quickly mature. Armed with the acceleration and retrograde guns, Gama Nezire was about to mature his siblings when the Megarangers led by the enhanced Super Mega Pink arrive and destroy the eggs. After being spirited off by Shibolena, Gama Nezire decides to use his acceleration gun to cause a volcanic eruption to call out the Megarangers and exact his revenge on them. Suffering side effects from her enhancement, Super Mega Pink eventually arrives to her team's aid and teams with Mega Yellow to defeat Gama Nezire to return to normal. After being bitten by Bibidebi, Gama Nezire is caught off guard by Galaxy Mega's Super Denji Snake before being destroyed by the Mega Flying Cutter attack.
 : A Nezire Beast that appears in the Nasu Plateau to burn down a forest to for the Nezirejians to obtain a meteor that fell there years ago. Confronted by Mega Black, Kinoko Nezire battles the Megarangers until the forest boy's interference drives them out of the forest. After having his wounds healed, Kinoko Nezire resumes his attack as a giant before Galaxy Mega appears destroy him with the Mega Straight Cutter attack.
 : A Nejire Beast used by Shibolena to use his stinger to brainwash the children Guirail captured for his plan to take out a communications building. Though held off by Guirail, Mega Red defeats Sasori Nezire with the Battle Rizer to break his hold over the children. Bitten by Bibidebi, Sasori Nezire is destroyed by Galaxy Mega's Mega Dash Cutter.
 : Created by Shibolena, the Nezire Beast was modified by Guirail against her wishes to split into two separate monsters: The tail-armed Wani Nezire 1 and the head-armed Wani Nezire 2. Catching the Megarangers off guard, Wani Nezire fights them until Bibidebi bites him and then splits after being hit by Galaxy Mega's Mega Flying Cutter. The splintered monster overpowers Galaxy Mega until the completed Delta Mega arrives to even the odds as the two robots destroy the Wani Nezires with their fire power.
 : A Nezire Beast used by Guirail in a plan to pirate Delta Mega with the Grand Neziros. "Resurrecting" fallen Nezire Beasts, Mukade Nezire enlarges as his revived Nezires overwhelm the Megarangers, to keep them from using Galaxy Mega and force Mega Red to call Delta Mega, springing Guirail's trap. Managing to form Super Galaxy Mega to break Nezirejia's hold over Delta Mega, the Megarangers use their newly formed robot to destroy Mukade Nezire, causing his revived Nezires to dissolve away, in the process.
 : This Nezire could create holes in the ground that would trap victims who fell into them. Killed by Super Galaxy Mega.
 : This Nezire Beast could turn people into stone with the antennae on his head. He was sent to absorb his younger sibling Komutan on Earth (who'd been befriend by Kenta) to reach his full potential and power. Killed by Super Galaxy Mega.
 : A dummy of the superstrong Nezire Beast was sent by Yugande to record the data on the Megarangers on the gem on its head, which survived the dummy's destruction and was inserted into the real Nezire Beast later in the same episode. Using it, Buffalo Nezire could deflect any attacks the Megarangers tried to inflict on him. His arrival signified the arrival of Mega Silver, whose moves were not analyzed by the dummy so the real Buffalo Nezire had no defense against his attacks. Killed by Super Galaxy Mega.
 : A Nezire species that was being bred by Guirail. Their mission was to poison the humans' water supply on Earth. The original creature was red, but a blue-colored clone was later created, seen, and used by Guirail. The blue one was killed by Super Galaxy Mega, while the red one was killed by Mega Silver (who shot Bibidebi before he could bite it too).
 : A renegade Nezire who stole a device to amplify its power. This Nezire could blast powerful sound waves and was very treacherous, not unlike Guirail. Killed by Super Galaxy Mega.
 : A Nezire that could slowly transform people into coral, which would eventually kill them in the process. Killed by Super Galaxy Mega.
 : A Nezire who could lay eggs and power them up to grow quickly. Killed by the combined efforts of Mega Red, Mega Black, Mega Blue, Mega Pink and Mega Silver. Her larvae, however, hatched and fused together to become Soldier Shiroari Nezire. This Nezire was stronger that his mother, and could turn into a swarm of termites to eat through anything (including the Megarangers weapons) and/or avoid the Megaranger's attacks. Killed by Super Galaxy Mega with a combination of using the Booster Rifle set on freezing gas and then using Super Galaxy Knuckle.
 : A monster who created and sold special "Diet Crêpes", while disguised as a chef, that actually induced people to eat anything nearby. While he was a formidable monster despite being quite comical, ButaNezire's weakness was hunger. He would abandon a fight, even if he was winning, to look for food if he became hungry. Killed by Super Galaxy Mega.

Psycho Nezilar
The  are more powerful monsters that Doctor Hinelar creates using his "piano." What makes them different from the Nezire Beasts is that they are more robotic and have a heightened psychotic nature.

 : A superstrong Psycho Nezilar who could blast the Megarangers with his large cannon and could detonate bombs if the Megarangers attacked him. Mega Red, with an upgrade to his Battle Raizer, was able to use this new energy to power up his Drill Sniper Custom into the Super Drill Sniper Custom, allowing him to kill Lion Nezilar fast enough before he could detonate any of his bombs. Killed by Mega Voyager. Was resurrected by Kani Nezilar, killed by the Mega Tector powered Megarangers.
 : A Psycho Nezilar who could turn soccer balls into explosive devices and kick them at humans to blow them up. Was resurrected by Kani Nezilar, killed by the Mega Tector powered Megarangers.
 : A Psycho Nezilar that took advantage of Mega Silver's short transformation weakness by affixing a time bomb to him set to go off when he reverted to normal. However, Mega Silver managed to upgrade his powers so he no longer had the time limit and was able to defeat him. Killed by Mega Voyager. Was resurrected by Kani Nezilar, killed by the Mega Tector powered Megarangers. 
 : A Psycho Nezilar that could fly really fast and blast enemies with his beak lasers. First to be killed by Wing Mega Voyager. Was resurrected by Kani Nezilar, killed by the Mega Tector powered Megarangers.
 : A Psycho Nezilar that had an "exchanging beam," allowing him to swap something he had for something someone else had, like his "old man" voice for Chisato's voice and goofy objects for the Megarangers' weapons. Kanaria Nezilar was sent by an unappreciated Bibidedi and stole Chisato's voice. Killed by Wing Mega Voyager.
 : A Psycho Nezilar with a satellite-like frill on his neck who could photograph the Megarangers through their helmets threatening to blackmail them, although it didn't work. He could also blast lasers from his mouth. Killed by Wing Mega Voyager. Was resurrected by Kani Nezilar, killed by the Mega Tector powered Megarangers.
 : Had a high-pressure water cannon concealed in his claw firing his "Crab Bubble" attack, and a strong shell on his back that could deflect his opponent's attacks. Killed by Wing Mega Voyager.
 : A plant-themed Psycho Nezilar whose power grew stronger from the thorns on his hand. It attached a small, mind-controlling earring to people, including Kenta and his classmate Shintaro, causing them to serve Dr. Hinelar and attack their friends. This happened until Kouichirou and the others destroyed the earrings. When Thorn-Needle Nezilar's thorns were destroyed, he lost most of his power and was able to be killed by Mega Voyager.
 : This Psycho Nezilar could make himself disappear and reappear in various locations. At one point, he confused the Megarangers by going to the southern end of Japan, and then back to Sapporo only to appear behind them afterwards. Killed by Mega Voyager.
 : A Psycho Nezilar who could suck up earthlings in his vacuum-like laser and transport them into Hinelar City. Killed by Mega Voyager.
 : A bat/Grim Reaper-designed Psycho Nezilar who was created to force the Megarangers to expose themselves in their High School, which they did. Though he died at the hands of Mega Voyager, he did managed to turn the heroes' schoolmates and friends against them.

Other Beasts 
 : The result of the Tanaka Project to produce an artificial creature which can endure in outer space and feed on energy from its feelers, almost all research relating to the entity was destroyed except a pendant containing an IC Chip holding the DNA sequence. After Shibolena acquires it, she use the data to create a Nezire Beast so that it would destroy humanity after absorbing enough electricity. After losing one of its feelers to the Megarangers, the Ultimate Lifeform enlarges and battles Galaxy Mega until it is destroyed by the robot's Mega Flash Arrow.

Episodes
On April 6, 1997, (The day that Episode 8 aired) the show later began to air on Sunday mornings at 7.30 am JST instead of late afternoons on a Friday. This time slot has been the regular time slot for Super Sentai shows until October 2017.

Denji Sentai Megaranger vs. Carranger
The V-Cinema special takes place between episodes 39 and 40. Arriving late for school, as the car was at Pegasus Garage, Kenta learns that today is graduation picture day. Seeing a beam of light nearby, Kouichirou gets the others out of class to investigate. The five find a seashell before they are attacked by Space Biker Helmedor who wants the shell to fulfill his dreams, overpowering the Megarangers before Mega Silver arrives and engages the biker in a motorcyclists' duel. Suddenly enlarging with his bike, Helmedor battles Super Galaxy Mega before he is forced to shrink and retreat. Later, while trying to find out the seashell's true nature, Miku uses it to wish for a big cake before it is stolen by a group of strange students who actually are the staff of the Pegasus Garage. But with Mega Yellow placing a tracer on the getaway car, the Megarangers track them to the Pegasus Garage where Kyousuke wishes for Katsudon before he and his team are attacked by Yugande and Crab Nezilar. Refusing to stand aside, they assume their Carranger forms to fight Crab Nezilar while the Megarangers deal with Yugande and the Kunekune. The two Sentai teams join forces to force the Nezirejians back as the shell opens up to reveal an alien identified as Space Fairy Picot who wants to grant their last three wishes. Arriving at Yume Beach, the teams get to know each other while talking out to want they would use the last three wishes before Dappu arrives. But "Dappu" turns out to be Helmedor, having made a deal with the Nezirejians to get Picot.

As Helmedor runs off, Shibonlena has the Kunekune hold the Megarangers as she uses her power to turn the Carrangers into her slaves and sicks them on the Megarangers. During the fight, the Megarangers find the real Dappu and untie him. In a risky gambit, Dappu fuses the Megrangers' weapons with his Carmagic to free the Carrangers from Shibolena's spell. At that time, after wishing for a planet-destroying laser cannon, Helmedor betrays Crab Nezilar and fights him. After making a wish to revive previous Psycho Nezilars to overpower the Megarangers, Crab Nezilars was about to make the final wish when Helmedor steals the fairy. But the Carrangers get Picot and throw a decoy into the distance to hold the villains at bay. Coming to the students' aid, the Carrangers give them Picot to make the final wish to their shock. By the time Crab Nezilar and a brainwashed Helmedor return to the battlefield, the Megarangers' wish to keep fighting enables them to don the Mega Tector armor. After destroying the revived monsters with Rainbow Impulse, Shibolena has Bebedebi bite Crab Nezilar and Helmedor as Mega Voyager and RV Robo are formed to fight them. Though Helmedor attempts to turn with the planting destroying laser, Mega Winger destroys the weapon as Wing Mega Voyager and RV Robo perform their finishers to respectively destroy Crab Nezilar and Helmedor. Soon after, Picot leaves for the next planet as the two sentai teams go out to take their own graduation memorial picture at Yume Beach.

Cast
 Hayato Ōshiba: Kenta Date 
 Atsushi Ehara: Koichiro Endou
 Masaya Matsukaze: Shun Namiki
 Eri Tanaka: Chisato Jogasaki
 Mami Higashiyama: Miku Inanuma
 Shigeru Kanai: Yuusaku Hayakawa
 Takumi Hashimoto: Jirou Iwamoto 
 Yoshihiro Nozoe: Gen Ooiwa
 Ryūzaburō Ōtomo: Evil Electro-King Javious I (Voice)
 Asami Jō: Shizuka Samejima/Shibolena, Hizumina
 Tetsuo Morishita: Professor Samejima/Dr. Hinelar
 Tomokazu Seki: Bibidebi (Voice)
 Hirotaka Suzuoki: Yugande (Voice)
 Tatsuyuki Jinnai: Guirail (Voice)
 Toshiro Tantsu: Nezi Red/Nezi Phantom (Voice)
 Kunihiko Yasui: Nezi Black/Nezi Vulgar (Voice)
 Yoshiharu Yamada: Nezi Blue/Nezi Bizarre (Voice)
 Masako Katsuki: Nezi Yellow/Nezi Sophia (Voice)
 Erina Yamazaki: Nezi Pink/Nezi Jealous (Voice)
 Samuel Pop Aning: Pop, Digitizer (Voice)

Songs
Opening theme

Lyrics: Saburo Yatsude
Composition & Arrangement: Keiichi Oku
Artist: Naoto Fūga

Ending themes

Lyrics: Saburo Yatsude
Composition & Arrangement: 
Artist: Naoto Fūga
Episodes: 1–20 & 31–50

Lyrics: Shoko Fujibayashi
Composition & Arrangement: Toshihiko Sahashi
Artist: Hiroko Asakawa
Episodes: 21–30

International Broadcast and Home Video
The series aired in Hong Kong with a Cantonese Chinese dub on TVB Jade from November 26, 2000 until November 4, 2001, with all 51 episodes dubbed. 
The series aired in Thailand with a Thai dub produced by Na Toi Senbe for Channel 9 in 2001 and distributed by Toon Town Entertainment, despite Power Rangers in Space was aired there a year ago. For home video releases, Video Square had the home video license rights for VCD and DVD distributed by EVS Company with the same dub carried over.
In North America, the series would receive a DVD release by Shout! Factory on October 31, 2017 in the original Japanese audio with English subtitles. It is the sixth Super Sentai series to be officially released in the region.

Notes

References

External links

 Official Denji Sentai Megaranger website 
 Official Shout! Factory page
 Official Shout Factory TV page

Super Sentai
Japanese high school television series
1997 Japanese television series debuts
1998 Japanese television series endings
Japanese action television series
Japanese fantasy television series
Japanese science fiction television series
1990s Japanese television series
Television series about teenagers